Lagunella is a genus of funnel weavers containing the single species, Lagunella guaycura. It was  first described by J. Maya-Morales, M. L. Jiménez, G. Murugan & C. Palacios-Cardiel in 2017, and is only found in Mexico.

References

External links

Agelenidae
Monotypic Araneomorphae genera